Complexity characterises the behaviour of a system or model whose components interact in multiple ways and follow local rules, leading to nonlinearity, randomness, collective dynamics, hierarchy, and emergence.

The term is generally used to characterize something with many parts where those parts interact with each other in multiple ways, culminating in a higher order of emergence greater than the sum of its parts. The study of these complex linkages at various scales is the main goal of complex systems theory.

The intuitive criterion of complexity can be formulated as follows: a system would be more complex if more parts could be distinguished, and if more connections between them existed.

Science  takes a number of approaches to characterizing complexity; Zayed et al.
reflect many of these. Neil Johnson states that "even among scientists, there is no unique definition of complexity – and the scientific notion has traditionally been conveyed using particular examples..."  Ultimately Johnson adopts the definition of "complexity science" as "the study of the phenomena which emerge from a collection of interacting objects".

Overview 
Definitions of complexity often depend on the concept of a "system" – a set of parts or elements that have relationships among them differentiated from relationships with other elements outside the relational regime. Many definitions tend to postulate or assume that complexity expresses a condition of numerous elements in a system and numerous forms of relationships among the elements. However, what one sees as complex and what one sees as simple is relative and changes with time.

Warren Weaver posited in 1948 two forms of complexity: disorganized complexity, and organized complexity.
Phenomena of 'disorganized complexity' are treated using probability theory and statistical mechanics, while 'organized complexity' deals with phenomena that escape such approaches and confront "dealing simultaneously with a sizable number of factors which are interrelated into an organic whole". Weaver's 1948 paper has influenced subsequent thinking about complexity.

The approaches that embody concepts of systems, multiple elements, multiple relational regimes, and state spaces might be summarized as implying that complexity arises from the number of distinguishable relational regimes (and their associated state spaces) in a defined system.

Some definitions relate to the algorithmic basis for the expression of a complex phenomenon or model or mathematical expression, as later set out herein.

Disorganized vs. organized 
One of the problems in addressing complexity issues has been formalizing the intuitive conceptual distinction between the large number of variances in relationships extant in random collections, and the sometimes large, but smaller, number of relationships between elements in systems where constraints (related to correlation of otherwise independent elements) simultaneously reduce the variations from element independence and create distinguishable regimes of more-uniform, or correlated, relationships, or interactions.

Weaver perceived and addressed this problem, in at least a preliminary way, in drawing a distinction between "disorganized complexity" and "organized complexity".

In Weaver's view, disorganized complexity results from the particular system having a very large number of parts, say millions of parts, or many more. Though the interactions of the parts in a "disorganized complexity" situation can be seen as largely random, the properties of the system as a whole can be understood by using probability and statistical methods.

A prime example of disorganized complexity is a gas in a container, with the gas molecules as the parts. Some would suggest that a system of disorganized complexity may be compared with the (relative) simplicity of planetary orbits – the latter can be predicted by applying Newton's laws of motion. Of course, most real-world systems, including planetary orbits, eventually become theoretically unpredictable even using Newtonian dynamics; as discovered by modern chaos theory.

Organized complexity, in Weaver's view, resides in nothing else than the non-random, or correlated, interaction between the parts. These correlated relationships create a differentiated structure that can, as a system, interact with other systems. The coordinated system manifests properties not carried or dictated by individual parts. The organized aspect of this form of complexity vis-a-vis to other systems than the subject system can be said to "emerge," without any "guiding hand".

The number of parts does not have to be very large for a particular system to have emergent properties. A system of organized complexity may be understood in its properties (behavior among the properties) through modeling and simulation, particularly modeling and simulation with computers. An example of organized complexity is a city neighborhood as a living mechanism, with the neighborhood people among the system's parts.

Sources and factors 
There are generally rules which can be invoked to explain the origin of complexity in a given system.

The source of disorganized complexity is the large number of parts in the system of interest, and the lack of correlation between elements in the system.

In the case of self-organizing living systems, usefully organized complexity comes from beneficially mutated organisms being selected to survive by their environment for their differential reproductive ability or at least success over inanimate matter or less organized complex organisms. See e.g. Robert Ulanowicz's treatment of ecosystems.

Complexity of an object or system is a relative property. For instance, for many functions (problems), such a computational complexity as time of computation is smaller when multitape Turing machines are used than when Turing machines with one tape are used. Random Access Machines allow one to even more decrease time complexity (Greenlaw and Hoover 1998: 226), while inductive Turing machines can decrease even the complexity class of a function, language or set (Burgin 2005). This shows that tools of activity can be an important factor of complexity.

Varied meanings 
In several scientific fields, "complexity" has a precise meaning:

 In computational complexity theory, the amounts of resources required for the execution of algorithms is studied. The most popular types of computational complexity are the time complexity of a problem equal to the number of steps that it takes to solve an instance of the problem as a function of the size of the input (usually measured in bits), using the most efficient algorithm, and the space complexity of a problem equal to the volume of the memory used by the algorithm (e.g., cells of the tape) that it takes to solve an instance of the problem as a function of the size of the input (usually measured in bits), using the most efficient algorithm. This allows classification of computational problems by complexity class (such as P, NP, etc.). An axiomatic approach to computational complexity was developed by Manuel Blum. It allows one to deduce many properties of concrete computational complexity measures, such as time complexity or space complexity, from properties of axiomatically defined measures.
 In algorithmic information theory, the Kolmogorov complexity (also called descriptive complexity, algorithmic complexity or algorithmic entropy) of a string is the length of the shortest binary program that outputs that string. Minimum message length is a practical application of this approach. Different kinds of Kolmogorov complexity are studied: the uniform complexity, prefix complexity, monotone complexity, time-bounded Kolmogorov complexity, and space-bounded Kolmogorov complexity. An axiomatic approach to Kolmogorov complexity based on Blum axioms (Blum 1967) was introduced by Mark Burgin in the paper presented for publication by Andrey Kolmogorov. The axiomatic approach encompasses other approaches to Kolmogorov complexity. It is possible to treat different kinds of Kolmogorov complexity as particular cases of axiomatically defined generalized Kolmogorov complexity. Instead of proving similar theorems, such as the basic invariance theorem, for each particular measure, it is possible to easily deduce all such results from one corresponding theorem proved in the axiomatic setting. This is a general advantage of the axiomatic approach in mathematics. The axiomatic approach to Kolmogorov complexity was further developed in the book (Burgin 2005) and applied to software metrics (Burgin and Debnath, 2003; Debnath and Burgin, 2003).
In information theory, information fluctuation complexity is the fluctuation of information about information entropy. It is derivable from fluctuations in the predominance of order and chaos in a dynamic system and has been used as a measure of complexity in many diverse fields.
 In information processing, complexity is a measure of the total number of properties transmitted by an object and detected by an observer. Such a collection of properties is often referred to as a state.
 In physical systems, complexity is a measure of the probability of the state vector of the system. This should not be confused with entropy; it is a distinct mathematical measure, one in which two distinct states are never conflated and considered equal, as is done for the notion of entropy in statistical mechanics.
 In dynamical systems, statistical complexity measures the size of the minimum program able to statistically reproduce the patterns (configurations) contained in the data set (sequence). While the algorithmic complexity implies a deterministic description of an object (it measures the information content of an individual sequence), the statistical complexity, like forecasting complexity, implies a statistical description, and refers to an ensemble of sequences generated by a certain source. Formally, the statistical complexity reconstructs a minimal model comprising the collection of all histories sharing a similar probabilistic future, and measures the entropy of the probability distribution of the states within this model. It is a computable and observer-independent measure based only on the internal dynamics of the system, and has been used in studies of emergence and self-organization. 
 In mathematics, Krohn–Rhodes complexity is an important topic in the study of finite semigroups and automata.
 In Network theory complexity is the product of richness in the connections between components of a system, and defined by a very unequal distribution of certain measures (some elements being highly connected and some very few, see complex network). 
 In software engineering, programming complexity is a measure of the interactions of the various elements of the software. This differs from the computational complexity described above in that it is a measure of the design of the software.

Other fields introduce less precisely defined notions of complexity:

 A complex adaptive system has some or all of the following attributes:
 The number of parts (and types of parts) in the system and the number of relations between the parts is non-trivial – however, there is no general rule to separate "trivial" from "non-trivial";
 The system has memory or includes feedback;
 The system can adapt itself according to its history or feedback;
 The relations between the system and its environment are non-trivial or non-linear;
 The system can be influenced by, or can adapt itself to, its environment;
 The system is highly sensitive to initial conditions.

Study 
Complexity has always been a part of our environment, and therefore many scientific fields have dealt with complex systems and phenomena. From one perspective, that which is somehow complex – displaying variation without being random – is most worthy of interest given the rewards found in the depths of exploration.

The use of the term complex is often confused with the term complicated. In today's systems, this is the difference between myriad connecting "stovepipes" and effective "integrated" solutions. This means that complex is the opposite of independent, while complicated is the opposite of simple.

While this has led some fields to come up with specific definitions of complexity, there is a more recent movement to regroup observations from different fields to study complexity in itself, whether it appears in anthills, human brains, or economic systems, social systems. One such interdisciplinary group of fields is relational order theories.

Topics

Behaviour 
The behavior of a complex system is often said to be due to emergence and self-organization. Chaos theory has investigated the sensitivity of systems to variations in initial conditions as one cause of complex behaviour.

Mechanisms 
Recent developments in artificial life, evolutionary computation and genetic algorithms have led to an increasing emphasis on complexity and complex adaptive systems.

Simulations 
In social science, the study on the emergence of macro-properties from the micro-properties, also known as macro-micro view in sociology. The topic is commonly recognized as social complexity that is often related to the use of computer simulation in social science, i.e.: computational sociology.

Systems 

Systems theory has long been concerned with the study of complex systems (in recent times, complexity theory and complex systems have also been used as names of the field). These systems are present in the research of a variety disciplines, including biology, economics, social studies and technology. Recently, complexity has become a natural domain of interest of real world socio-cognitive systems and emerging systemics research. Complex systems tend to be high-dimensional, non-linear, and difficult to model. In specific circumstances, they may exhibit low-dimensional behaviour.

Data 
In information theory, algorithmic information theory is concerned with the complexity of strings of data.

Complex strings are harder to compress. While intuition tells us that this may depend on the codec used to compress a string (a codec could be theoretically created in any arbitrary language, including one in which the very small command "X" could cause the computer to output a very complicated string like "18995316"), any two Turing-complete languages can be implemented in each other, meaning that the length of two encodings in different languages will vary by at most the length of the "translation" language – which will end up being negligible for sufficiently large data strings.

These algorithmic measures of complexity tend to assign high values to random noise. However, those studying complex systems would not consider randomness as complexity.

Information entropy is also sometimes used in information theory as indicative of complexity, but entropy is also high for randomness. Information fluctuation complexity, fluctuations of information about entropy, does not consider randomness to be complex and has been useful in many applications.

Recent work in machine learning has examined the complexity of the data as it affects the performance of supervised classification algorithms. Ho and Basu present a set of complexity measures for binary classification problems.

The complexity measures broadly cover:
 the overlaps in feature values from differing classes.
 the separability of the classes.
 measures of geometry, topology, and density of manifolds. Instance hardness is another approach seeks to characterize the data complexity with the goal of determining how hard a data set is to classify correctly and is not limited to binary problems. 
Instance hardness is a bottom-up approach that first seeks to identify instances that are likely to be misclassified (or, in other words, which instances are the most complex). The characteristics of the instances that are likely to be misclassified are then measured based on the output from a set of hardness measures. The hardness measures are based on several supervised learning techniques such as measuring the number of disagreeing neighbors or the likelihood of the assigned class label given the input features. The information provided by the complexity measures has been examined for use in meta-learning to determine for which data sets filtering (or removing suspected noisy instances from the training set) is the most beneficial and could be expanded to other areas.

In molecular recognition 
A recent study based on molecular simulations and compliance constants describes molecular recognition as a phenomenon of organisation.
Even for small molecules like carbohydrates, the recognition process can not be predicted or designed even assuming that each individual hydrogen bond's strength is exactly known.

The law of requisite complexity 
Driving from the law of requisite variety, Boisot and McKelvey formulated the ‘Law of Requisite Complexity’, that holds that, in order to be efficaciously adaptive, the internal complexity of a system must match the external complexity it confronts.

Positive, appropriate and negative complexity 
The application in project management of the Law of Requisite Complexity, as proposed by Stefan Morcov, is the analysis of positive, appropriate and negative complexity.

In project management 
Project complexity is the property of a project which makes it difficult to understand, foresee, and keep under control its overall behavior, even when given reasonably complete information about the project system.

In systems engineering 
Maik Maurer considers complexity as a reality in engineering. He proposed a methodology for managing complexity in systems engineering :

                             1.           Define the system.

                             2.           Identify the type of complexity.

                             3.           Determine the strategy.

                             4.           Determine the method.

                             5.           Model the system.

                             6.           Implement the method.

Applications 
Computational complexity theory is the study of the complexity of problems – that is, the difficulty of solving them. Problems can be classified by complexity class according to the time it takes for an algorithm – usually a computer program – to solve them as a function of the problem size. Some problems are difficult to solve, while others are easy. For example, some difficult problems need algorithms that take an exponential amount of time in terms of the size of the problem to solve. Take the travelling salesman problem, for example. It can be solved in time  (where n is the size of the network to visit – the number of cities the travelling salesman must visit exactly once). As the size of the network of cities grows, the time needed to find the route grows (more than) exponentially.

Even though a problem may be computationally solvable in principle, in actual practice it may not be that simple. These problems might require large amounts of time or an inordinate amount of space. Computational complexity may be approached from many different aspects. Computational complexity can be investigated on the basis of time, memory or other resources used to solve the problem. Time and space are two of the most important and popular considerations when problems of complexity are analyzed.

There exist a certain class of problems that although they are solvable in principle they require so much time or space that it is not practical to attempt to solve them. These problems are called intractable.

There is another form of complexity called hierarchical complexity. It is orthogonal to the forms of complexity discussed so far, which are called horizontal complexity.

Emerging Applications in Other Fields   

The concept of complexity is being increasingly used in the study of Cosmology, Big History, and  Cultural Evolution with increasing granularity, as well as increasing quantification.

Application in Cosmology 
Eric Chaisson advanced  a cosmoglogical complexity  metric he terms Energy Rate Density.  This approach has been expanded in various works, most recently applied to measuring evolving complexity of nation-states and their growing cities.

See also 

 Assembly theory
 Chaos theory
 Complexity theory (disambiguation page)
Complex network
Complex system
 Cyclomatic complexity
 Digital morphogenesis
 Dual-phase evolution
 Emergence
 Evolution of complexity
Fractal
 Game complexity
 Holism in science
 Law of Complexity/Consciousness
 Model of hierarchical complexity
 Names of large numbers
 Network science
 Network theory
 Novelty theory
 Occam's razor
Percolation theory
 Process architecture
 Programming Complexity
 Sociology and complexity science
 Systems theory
 Thorngate's postulate of commensurate complexity
 Variety (cybernetics)
 Volatility, uncertainty, complexity and ambiguity
 Arthur Winfree
 Computational irreducibility
 Zero-Force Evolutionary Law
 Project complexity

References

Further reading 

 
 
 
 
 
 Burgin, M. (1982) Generalized Kolmogorov complexity and duality in theory of computations, Notices of the Russian Academy of Sciences, v.25, No. 3, pp. 19–23
 Meyers, R.A., (2009) "Encyclopedia of Complexity and Systems Science", 
 Mitchell, M. (2009). Complexity: A Guided Tour. Oxford University Press, Oxford, UK.
 Gershenson, C., Ed. (2008). Complexity: 5 Questions. Automatic Peess / VIP.

External links 

 Complexity Measures – an article about the abundance of not-that-useful complexity measures.
 Exploring Complexity in Science and Technology  – Introductory complex system course by Melanie Mitchell
 Santa Fe Institute focusing on the study of complexity science: Lecture Videos
 UC Four Campus Complexity Videoconferences – Human Sciences and Complexity

Abstraction
Chaos theory
Complex systems theory
Holism
Systems
Transdisciplinarity